

Participating nations and athletes

Results

Oberstdorf
 Schattenbergschanze, Oberstdorf
30 December 1972

Garmisch-Partenkirchen
 Große Olympiaschanze, Garmisch-Partenkirchen
1 January 1973

Innsbruck
 Bergiselschanze, Innsbruck
3 January 1973

Bischofshofen
 Paul-Ausserleitner-Schanze, Bischofshofen
6 January 1973

Final ranking

References

External links
 FIS website
 Four Hills Tournament web site

Four Hills Tournament
1972 in ski jumping
1973 in ski jumping